Shahr-e Aftab Metro Station is a station in Tehran Metro Line 1. It is located in Aftab Rural District, near Behesht-e Zahra. The station serves Shahr-e Aftab Expo and Shahed University.  The next station is on one end Shahed - Bagher Shahr Metro Station, towards Tehran city centre, and the other end Shahr-e Forudgahi-e Imam Khomeini Metro Station.

References

Tehran Metro stations